At least three warships of Japan have been named Michishio:

 , an  launched in 1937 and sunk in 1944.
 , an  launched in 1967 and stricken in 1985.
 , an  launched in 1997.

Japanese Navy ship names
Japan Maritime Self-Defense Force ship names